Kuda Kala Kamanafaanu (died 1609), was a monarch, as Sultana regnant, of the Maldives from 1607 until 1609.

Kuda Kala was monarch during an unstable period of the Maldives  and was not able to secure her rule due to a civil war. She died during a pilgrimage at the Mahibadu island in the Ari-atholl.

References
 http://www.guide2womenleaders.com/Maldive_Heads.htm
 http://www.guide2womenleaders.com/womeninpower/Womeninpower1600.htm

17th-century sultans of the Maldives
17th-century women rulers
1609 deaths
Year of birth missing